Jacqueline Lelong-Ferrand (17 February 1918, Alès, France – 26 April 2014, Sceaux, France) was a French mathematician who worked on conformal representation theory, potential theory, and Riemannian manifolds. She taught at universities in  Caen, Lille, and Paris.

Education and career
Ferrand was born in Alès, the daughter of a classics teacher, and went to secondary school in Nîmes.
In 1936 the École Normale Supérieure began admitting women, and she was one of the first to apply and be admitted. In 1939 she and Roger Apéry placed first in the mathematics agrégation; she began teaching at a girls' school in Sèvres, while continuing to do mathematics research under the supervision of Arnaud Denjoy, publishing three papers in 1941 and defending a doctoral thesis in 1942. In 1943 she won the Girbal-Baral Prize of the French Academy of Sciences, and obtained a faculty position at the University of Bordeaux. She moved to the University of Caen in 1945, was given a chair at the University of Lille in 1948, and in 1956 moved to the University of Paris as a full professor. She retired in 1984.

Contributions
Ferrand had nearly 100 mathematical publications, including ten books, and was active in mathematical research into her late 70s. 
One of her accomplishments, in 1971, was to prove the compactness of the group of conformal mappings of a non-spherical compact Riemannian manifold, resolving a conjecture of André Lichnerowicz, and on the basis of this work she became an invited speaker at the 1974 International Congress of Mathematicians in Vancouver.

Personal life
She married mathematician Pierre Lelong in 1947, taking his surname alongside hers in her subsequent publications until their separation in 1977.

References

Links
ChronoMath, une chronologie des MATHÉMATIQUES ; accessed 5 May 2014

1918 births
2014 deaths
École Normale Supérieure alumni
French mathematicians
Women mathematicians
People from Alès
20th-century French women scientists